Soraisam Pritam Kumar Singh (born 10 December 1995) is an Indian professional footballer who plays as a defender for the East Bengal in the Indian Super League.

Career
Born in Manipur, Singh was a part of the AIFF Elite Academy. Before the 2015–16 I-League, Singh was announced as part of the Shillong Lajong. He made his debut for the club on 10 January 2016 against Mumbai. He played the full match as Shillong Lajong drew 0–0.

Kerala Blasters
On 23 July 2017, Singh was selected in the 11th round of the 2017–18 ISL Players Draft by the Kerala Blasters for the 2017–18 Indian Super League season. He made his debut for the club on 3 December 2017 against Mumbai City. He came on as a halftime minute substitute for Rino Anto as Kerala Blasters drew 1–1.

Hyderabad 
On 18 August 2021, Singh signed for Hyderabad FC from East Bengal ahead of the 2021–22 Indian Super League season.

International
As part of the AIFF Elite Academy, Singh was also part of the India under-19 side.

Career statistics

References

External links 
 Indian Super League Profile

1995 births
Living people
People from Bishnupur, Manipur
Indian footballers
Shillong Lajong FC players
NorthEast United FC players
Kerala Blasters FC players
East Bengal Club players
Association football defenders
Footballers from Manipur
I-League players
Indian Super League players
India youth international footballers